Heinrich Zänker (22 September 1902 – 1 June 1984) was a German rower. He competed in the men's coxless four event at the 1928 Summer Olympics.

References

1902 births
1984 deaths
Rowers from Dresden
People from the Kingdom of Saxony
German male rowers
Olympic rowers of Germany
Rowers at the 1928 Summer Olympics